Saint Estelle was an alleged third-century martyr in Gaul, daughter of an illustrious Roman and descended from a powerful family of Druids. She was attracted to the group of Eutropius of Saintes, who was the first bishop of the area, and asked to be baptized. When she refused to abjure, her father condemned her to death in the arena. She has been popular in the Charentaise region and was considered a patron saint of young Christian girls.

Saint Estelle is celebrated on 11 May.

References

French Roman Catholic saints